Kara Ben Nemsi Effendi is a German television series broadcast from 1973 through 1975 in 26 parts and two seasons. It featured an adventurer probably inspired by British explorers Richard Francis Burton (1821–1890) and T. E. Lawrence. The scripts were faithful to Karl May's Orient novels, and the score is from Martin Böttcher who previously had composed the music for ten very successful Karl May films in cinema, and also for the two parts of Winnetous Rückkehr in 1998, also being aired by the German station ZDF.

Protagonist 
Kara Ben Nemsi (Karl Michael Vogler) has traveled the Wild West as Old Shatterhand and is now about to explore the Near East. His traditional German first name Karl is difficult for many non-Germans to pronounce, so his oriental sidekick Hadschi Halef Omar prefers to call him "Kara".

Kara Ben Nemsi, a German hero-adventurer of the 1880s, is actually a kind of superman (as was Doc Savage later), not only speaking dozens of foreign tongues fluently but also being able to knock out everybody with just one blow to the temple. He rides his famous black stallion Rih as well as Frank Hopkins could, and is such an excellent marksman he could work in Wild West shows.

Hadschi Halef Omar (played by Heinz Schubert, best known from the German version of the British television series Till Death Us Do Part, is the hero's scout and his teacher when it comes to oriental conventions. He always shows solidarity although the very self-confident Kara Ben Nemsi is always prone to take risks.

Production 
The 13 parts of the first season were filmed from August to September 1972 in the Carpathian Mountains and Bulgaria and from October to November 1972 in the deserts of Tunisia. The 13 parts of the second season were filmed from June to August 1974 in Spain around Almeria, mainly for financial reasons. The director engaged many popular guest stars, including Ferdy Mayne, Heinz Baumann, Dieter Hallervorden and Willy Semmelrogge.

Other films 
Kara Ben Nemsi not only was to be seen in this TV series, but also in the films:

 Auf den Trümmern des Paradieses (1920) with Carl de Vogt
 Die Todeskarawane (1920) with Carl de Vogt
 Die Teufelsanbeter (1921) with Carl de Vogt
 Durch die Wüste (1936) with 
  (1958) with Viktor Staal
  (1959) with Helmuth Schneider
  (1964) with Lex Barker
  (1965) with Lex Barker
  (1965) with Lex Barker

DVD release 
The complete series was released on DVD in 2006/2007. In the second DVD box a soundtrack CD with the music of Martin Böttcher is included.

References

External links 

German drama television series
Television shows based on German novels
1973 German television series debuts
1975 German television series endings
Television series set in the 19th century
German-language television shows
ZDF original programming
Films shot in Bulgaria
1970s adventure films
Television shows based on works by Karl May
Films shot in Almería